Carposina diampyx is a moth in the Carposinidae family. It is found in Armenia.

References

Natural History Museum Lepidoptera generic names catalog

Carposinidae
Moths described in 1989
Moths of Asia